Benford is an English surname of unknown origin. Notable people with the surname include:

Christian Benford (born 2000), American football player
 Frank Benford, American scientist who gives his name to:
 Benford's law, which holds that in large sets of data, individual numbers are more likely to start with lower digits
 Gregory Benford, American science fiction author and astrophysicist
 Tommy Benford, American jazz drummer

Fictional characters:
 Mark Benford, main character of the TV series FlashForward

See also

References